KFBX (970 AM) is a commercial radio station programming news/talk in Fairbanks, Alaska, United States. It airs hourly news updates through ABC News Radio. It is owned and operated by 

KFBX airs national radio programs from Compass Media Networks and Premiere Networks.

History
On July 24, 1970, Big Country Radio, Inc., owner of KYAK in Anchorage, applied for a construction permit to build a new radio station on 970 kHz in Fairbanks, which was approved on January 13, 1971. The station began broadcasting as KIAK on September 18, 1972, airing a country music format.

Big Country Radio sold its three Alaska radio properties—KIAK, KYAK and Anchorage FM outlet KGOT—to Prime Time of Alaska, a company owned by interests from Washington state, in 1978 for more than $3 million. Prime Time owned a country music station in Everett, Washington, KWYZ.

1983 was an eventful year for KIAK. Prime Time sold the station to Bingham Broadcasting, controlled by a minority owner of a Seattle station, for $4.5 million. The sale included KIAK's FM construction permit, KQRZ (102.5 FM), which launched that July and originally played a Top 40 format. At the end of that month, a 28-year-old man threatened to blow up the station if he did not get air time; he was startled to find that the station was actually an automated operation and ultimately surrendered. In fact, KIAK had been automated since 1975, using a syndicated format from Drake-Chenault; the automation equipment was dubbed by the station as the "Big Country Machine".

Bingham sold all four of his stations—AM-FM pairs in Anchorage and Fairbanks—to Olympia Broadcasting for about $12 million at the very end of 1985. In January 1990, the contemporary country format of KIAK moved to the former KQRZ, which became KIAK-FM; KIAK began to focus more on a classic country format and added several new talk programs. Olympia would file for Chapter 11 bankruptcy protection in June 1990, setting off a lengthy process that included three different abortive sale attempts of the company's four Alaska properties. A deal with Harbor Broadcasting was doomed by a license challenge by the NAACP; while a settlement was reached, the FCC conditioned the sale on the license renewals, and Olympia was anxious to sell the stations to satisfy its creditors. The next sale attempt, to Alpha & Beta Broadcasting, was canceled by the company's receiver in early 1992 due to a conflict between creditor Barclays and lender Greyhound Financial; the latter felt that the stations had sold for too little money. In January 1993, the receiver proposed to sell the stations to Community Pacific Broadcasting for $1.2 million, but this was superseded by a $1.45 million offer from Craig McCaw's COMCO Broadcasting. By this time, KIAK had largely become a sports talk outlet.

Comco sold its entire station portfolio, including KIAK-AM-FM and KAKQ-FM in Fairbanks, to Capstar Broadcasting Partners, a forerunner to present owner iHeartMedia, in 1997. The call letters were changed from KIAK to KFBX in October 2004.

References

External links
KFBX website

Talk radio stations in the United States
FBX
Radio stations established in 1972
1972 establishments in Alaska
IHeartMedia radio stations